The Australian Music Centre (AMC), formerly known briefly as Sounds Australian, is a national organisation promoting and supporting art music in Australia, founded in 1974. It co-hosts the Art Music Awards along with APRA AMCOS, and publishes Resonate Magazine.

Description

AMC provides advocacy, representation, and publishing services as well as career support and professional development programmes. Initially focussed on contemporary classical music, its purview has expanded to experimental music, sound art, contemporary jazz, and improvisatory music. In 1990 it briefly changed its name to Sounds Australian.
The AMC is the Australian national section of ISCM and IAMIC.

The Centre's collection includes a repository of Australian scores, recordings and teaching kits that numbered 13,000 items by 660 creators in 2017.

Governance 
The AMC was established in 1974 by its inaugural director, James Murdoch. For 32 years its CEO was John Davis, who left in 2021. In May 2021, he was succeeded by Catherine Haridy, who had worked in A&R for Mushroom Records and Warner Music Australia and founded her own artist management company in 2006. Marshall McGuire was appointed Chair of the Board in 2021.

Art Music Awards 
The AMC co-hosts the Art Music Awards along with APRA AMCOS, which acknowledges excellence among Australian composers, performers and educators in the genres of contemporary classical music, jazz, improvisation, sound art and experimental music.

The Art Music Awards were first held in 1988 under the banner 'The Sounds Australian Awards'.

Notable represented artists 
The Australian Music Centre represents Australian composers, improvisers and sound artists. Some notable represented artists include:

 Ross Edwards
 Mary Finsterer
 Peggy Glanville-Hicks
 Brenda Gifford
 Helen Gifford
 Percy Grainger 
 Cat Hope
 Elena Kats-Chernin
 Don Kay
 Bryony Marks

References

External links
 
 Resonate Magazine

Australian music industry
Music organisations based in Australia